Újezd is a municipality and village in Znojmo District in the South Moravian Region of the Czech Republic. It has about 80 inhabitants.

Notable people
Karl Schawerda (1869–1945), Austrian entomologist

References

Villages in Znojmo District